The 1934 Oregon Webfoots football team represented the University of Oregon in the Pacific Coast Conference (PCC) during the 1934 college football season.  In their third season under head coach Prink Callison, the Webfoots compiled a 6–4 record (4–2 against PCC opponents), finished in fourth place in the PCC, and outscored their opponents, 108 to 98. The team played its home games at Hayward Field in Eugene, Oregon.

Schedule

References

Oregon
Oregon Ducks football seasons
Oregon Webfoots football